The Tournoi de France is an invitational tournament for national teams in women's football hosted by the French Football Federation (FFF).

It is played in late February or early March, at the same time as the Algarve Cup, the Arnold Clark Cup, the Cup of Nations, the Cyprus Women's Cup, the Istria Cup, the Pinatar Cup, the SheBelieves Cup, the Turkish Women's Cup and the Women's Revelations Cup.

Format
The four invited teams play in a round-robin tournament. Points awarded in the group stage followed the formula of three points for a win, one point for a draw, and zero points for a loss. A tie in points would be decided by goal differential; other tie-breakers are used as needed.

Results

Statistics

Participating nations

 Tournament cancelled.

All-time table

Top goalscorers

See also
Tournoi de France, a men's football competition

References

 
International women's association football invitational tournaments
March sporting events
Recurring sporting events established in 2020